Ernest the Rebel (French: Ernest le rebelle) is a 1938 French comedy film directed by Christian-Jaque and starring Pierre Alcover, Mona Goya and Arthur Devère. It is based on the 1937 novel of the same title by Jacques Perret.

Location shooting took place on the Côte d'Azur around Nice, while interiors were filmed at the city's Victorine Studios. The film's sets were designed by the art director Pierre Schild.

Synopsis
The accordionist working on a cruise liner is accidentally left behind in a South American port and gets involved in a series of adventures.

Cast
 Fernandel as Ernest Pic
 Pierre Alcover as Tonio
 Mona Goya as Suzanne
 Arthur Devère as L'amiral
 René Génin as Démosthène
 Raoul Marco as Sam
 Montero as Le Noir
 Rosita Montenegro as Rosita
 Guillaume de Sax as Gruingue
 Robert Le Vigan as Le gouverneur-président de Mariposa

References

Bibliography
 Blakeway, Claire. Jacques Prévert: Popular French Theatre and Cinema. Fairleigh Dickinson University Press, 1990.

External links

1938 films
1930s French-language films
Films directed by Christian-Jaque
1938 comedy films
French comedy films
French black-and-white films
Films set in South America
Films shot in Nice
Films shot at Victorine Studios
1930s French films